Leeve Island is the low ice-free island in the Onogur group off the northwest coast of Robert Island in the South Shetland Islands, Antarctica extending 200 m in southeast-northwest direction and 80 m wide.  It is separated from Redina Island by a 100 m wide passage.

The island is named after Leeve River in Rila Mountain, Bulgaria.

Location
Leeve Island is located 1.46 km to the north of Misnomer Point and 640 m west-southwest of Shipot Point.  Bulgarian mapping in 2009.

Maps
 Livingston Island to King George Island.  Scale 1:200000.  Admiralty Nautical Chart 1776.  Taunton: UK Hydrographic Office, 1968.
 L.L. Ivanov. Antarctica: Livingston Island and Greenwich, Robert, Snow and Smith Islands. Scale 1:120000 topographic map. Troyan: Manfred Wörner Foundation, 2009.  (Second edition 2010)
Antarctic Digital Database (ADD). Scale 1:250000 topographic map of Antarctica. Scientific Committee on Antarctic Research (SCAR). Since 1993, regularly upgraded and updated.

References
 Leeve Island. SCAR Composite Antarctic Gazetteer.
 Bulgarian Antarctic Gazetteer. Antarctic Place-names Commission. (details in Bulgarian, basic data in English)

External links
 Leeve Island. Copernix satellite image

Islands of Robert Island
Bulgaria and the Antarctic